The West Bengal Fire Service is the state owned service that provides firefighting, rescue and emergency medical services to the state of West Bengal, India including the city of Kolkata. There are over 350 fire appliances at their disposal.

The Fire Service in West Bengal is the oldest fire service in the country. Calcutta Fire Brigade and Bengal Fire Service were amalgamated in 1950 to form the organisation. Fire Service Act was enacted in 1950 and amended in 1996 with inclusion of fire prevention and Fire Safety Rules. 103 fire stations are in operation. About 8000 Fire Force with over 350 fire appliances are in service.

References

External links
West Bengal Fire Service, Government of West Bengal

State agencies of West Bengal
Organisations based in Kolkata
Fire departments of India
1950 establishments in West Bengal